Albert Bonniers Förlag is a publishing company based in Stockholm, Sweden. Albert Bonniers Förlag is part of the book publishing house Bonnierförlagen, which also includes Wahlström & Widstrand and Bonnier Carlsen.

History
Albert Bonnier (1820–1900) established the company in 1837 in Stockholm. Under his son and successor Karl Otto Bonnier (1856–1941), the company grew to be one of the largest publishers in Sweden. Many well-known Swedish authors have been published by Albert Bonniers Förlag. Notable authors have included August Strindberg, Verner von Heidenstam, Gustaf Fröding, Selma Lagerlöf and Hjalmar Söderberg.

Albert Bonniers Förlag publishes around 100 books per year. Its publications have been characterized by versatility, including novels, poetry, memoirs, biographies, essays and travelogues as well as a variety of non-fiction books.
Contemporary writers include Tomas Tranströmer, Carlos Ruiz Zafón, Dan Brown and Åsa Larsson.

See also
 Bonnier family
 Bonnier Group

References

Other sources
Hermele, Bernt (2013)  Firman: Bonnier - Sveriges mäktigaste mediesläkt (Stockholm: Leopard)

External links
Albert Bonniers Förlag website
Bonnierforlagen website

Book publishing companies of Sweden
Publishing companies established in 1837
Mass media in Stockholm
Bonnier Group
Companies based in Stockholm
Swedish companies established in 1837